Senator Wayne may refer to:

Isaac Wayne (1772–1852), Pennsylvania State Senate
Justin Wayne (politician) (fl. 2010s–2020s), Nebraska State Senate